The Pune Challenger, previously known as the KPIT MSLTA Challenger, is a professional tennis tournament played on outdoor hard courts. It is currently part of the ATP Challenger Tour. It has been held annually at Shree Shiv Chhatrapati Sports Complex in Pune, India since 2014.

Past finals

Singles

Doubles

References

 
ATP Challenger Tour
Tennis tournaments in India
Hard court tennis tournaments
Sports competitions in Pune
Recurring sporting events established in 2014